Vernon Hills is a suburb north of Chicago, Illinois in Lake County, Illinois, United States. The population was 26,850 at the 2020 census. Vernon Hills serves as a retail hub for its surrounding area (Libertyville, Lake Forest, Long Grove, Lincolnshire and Buffalo Grove).

History 

The land that was to become Vernon Hills, founded by Richard Theodore Freese, Ron Freese, and Jim Carswell, began with the establishment of a  farm in 1857. Use of the land remained relatively static until the 1960s, when part of it was purchased for a residential community and golf course; the development was the first use of the name "Vernon Hills." On June 16, 1958, the village officially incorporated with 123 residents and 125 houses in a single subdivision built by Quinn Hogan and Barney Loeb. During these times, the village and police department were run from a local motel until 1971 when village trustees bought two portable buildings. It saw steady but slow growth until the annexing of a plot of land near the corner of IL-60 and IL-21 in 1971, which led to the building of  Hawthorn Center. By 1980, the village's population had grown to almost 10,000 residents, and by 2000, it had surpassed 20,000.

Through the 1980s and 1990s, the village grew geographically through the annexation of surrounding areas. This included land that would become the Corporate Woods business park and Centennial Crossing residential development (1986), a  section of Hawthorne-Mellody Farms (1988), and part of the village of Half Day (1994).

Geography 

Climate

Demographics

2020 census

2010 Census
As of the census of 2010, there were 20,120 people, 7,568 households, and 5,312 families residing in the village. The racial makeup of the village was 81.86% White, 1.69% African American, 11.67% Asian, 0.10% Native American, 0.03 Pacific Islander, 2.92% from other races, and 1.72% from two or more races. Hispanic or Latino of any race were 7.19% of the population.

There were 7,568 households, out of which 42.3% had children under the age of 18 living with them, 59.2% were married couples living together, 8.4% had a female householder with no husband present, and 29.8% were non-families. 24.8% of all households were made up of individuals, and 5.9% had someone living alone who was 65 years of age or older. The average household size was 2.66 and the average family size was 3.24.

In the village, the population was spread out, with 29.2% under the age of 18, 6.4% from 18 to 24, 36.8% from 25 to 44, 21.6% from 45 to 64, and 6.1% who were 65 years of age or older. The median age was 34 years. For every 100 females, there were 93.7 males. For every 100 females age 18 and over, there were 89.8 males.

The median income for a household in the village was $101,297, and the median income for a family was $123,806. Males had a median income of $94,807 versus $78,136 for females. The per capita income for the village was $72,219.  About 0.9% of families and 1.2% of the population were below the poverty line, including 3.0% of those under the age of 18 and 6.8% of those ages 65 and older.

In 2011 Vernon Hills had 4,858 persons of Asian ancestry, 19.3% of the village's population, the sixth highest percentage of Asians of any Chicago suburb. The Asian population figure was more than twice that of 2001. John Kalmar, the village manager, said that despite the increase from 2001 to 2011, "We haven't seen a specific increase in Asian-oriented types of businesses, and I haven't noticed in any significant way changes in what businesses are carrying."

Economy 
American Optical Company, a luxury eyewear designer and manufacturer
CDW, a provider of technology products and services for business, government and education, is based out of Vernon Hills.
Zebra Technologies, a manufacturer of thermal bar code label and receipt printers used by over 90 percent of Fortune 500 companies, is based out of Vernon Hills.
American Hotel Register Company, a well-known manufacturer and supplier of hospitality products and services, is based out of Vernon Hills.
Rust-Oleum Corporation, a worldwide leader in protective paints and coatings for both home and industry, is based out of Vernon Hills.
Elorac, Inc., a specialty pharmaceutical company focused on advancing treatments in dermatology, is based in Vernon Hills.
Cole-Parmer, a scientific and industrial instrument distributor

Recently, Vernon Hills developed a former 52 acre soybean field into a $200 million shopping center known as Mellody Farm, whose tenants are a host of restaurant and retail businesses.

When Tiger Electronics was an independent company, its headquarters were in Vernon Hills.

Top employers 
According to the Village's 2021 Annual Comprehensive Financial Report, the top employers in the city are:

Arts and culture
Vernon Hills is one of six communities which, in part, comprise the Cook Memorial Public Library District. The Evergreen Interim library, which was one of the District's two library facilities, closed on July 3, 2010. On July 10, 2010, the new Aspen Drive Library opened to the public. This  building is located across the street from the Vernon Hills Elementary and Grade School Campus at 701 N Aspen Drive.

The Aspen Drive Library in Vernon Hills is the village's first full-service library. The new library is 20,000 sq. ft. and offers 120,000 volumes of books, movies and music. The library also has an interactive children's department, a high-tech teen area, a state-of-the-art computer lab, small group study spaces and community meeting rooms.

The remainder of Vernon Hills is in the Vernon Area Public Library District.

Parks and recreation
In 2000, the village acquired land that had belonged at different times to the U.S. Army as a Nike missile base, the U.S. Navy as a naval training center, and the Curtiss Candy Company; it was converted to what is now the  Vernon Hills Athletic Complex (VHAC).

Government
Vernon Hills lies in the Illinois 10th Congressional District.

Education 
There are six grade schools in the village served by the Hawthorn School District. In 2006, Hawthorn Junior High School was formally divided into Hawthorn Middle School North and Hawthorn Middle School South. High school students, who formerly went to Libertyville High School, now attend (as of 2000–2001) either Vernon Hills High School or Libertyville High School.

Students living in the southwest corner of Vernon Hills attend Long Grove grade schools (Country Meadows & Woodlawn). Some subdivisions in southern Vernon Hills send students to Lincolnshire schools, including Adlai E. Stevenson High School. A small area in the southwest corner of the village is zoned to attend the high school in Mundelein, IL.

Elementary Schoolers may be enrolled in 4 different Hawthorn Schools. Hawthorn Elementary South, Hawthorn Elementary North, Aspen Elementary, or Townline Elementary. Currently, a Kindergarten Building is being constructed, expected to be finished by the school year of 2021. This may be delayed due to COVID-19.

Infrastructure

Transportation 
Vernon Hills has a station on Metra's North Central Service, which provides daily rail service between Antioch, Illinois and Chicago, Illinois (at Union Station).  It is also serviced by Pace buses.

Notable people 
 Sam Acho, football player
 Alex Brown, football player
 Desmond Clark, football player
 Tarik Cohen, football player
 DaVaris Daniels, football player
 Phillip Daniels, football player and coach
 David Dobrik, YouTuber
 Steve Dubinsky, hockey player
 Leonard Floyd, football player
 Robert P. Hanrahan, politician 
 Devin Hester, football player
 Christopher Howarth, figure skater 
 Kathleen A. Ryg, politician
 Cairo Santos, football player
 Carol Sente, politician 
 Nicole Sladkov, rhythmic gymnast
 Evan Spencer, football player
 Tim Spencer, football player and coach 
 Nathan Vasher, football player
 Kevin Walter, football player
 Cody Whitehair, football player

References

External links 

Village website

 
Villages in Lake County, Illinois
Populated places established in 1958